Owen is an unincorporated community in Owen Township, Clark County, Indiana.

History
Owen was originally called Herculaneum, and under the latter name was founded in 1830. A post office was established in Owen in 1878, and remained in operation until it was discontinued in 1933. The community's namesake, John Owen, was a county official.

Geography

See also
List of cities and towns along the Ohio River

References

Unincorporated communities in Clark County, Indiana
Unincorporated communities in Indiana
Louisville metropolitan area
Indiana populated places on the Ohio River
1830 establishments in Indiana